Mickey Boardman is the editorial director and advice columnist for Paper magazine.

Biography
Boardman was raised in Hanover Park, Illinois and graduated from Purdue University in 1989 with a degree in Spanish. After school, he spent a year in Madrid, Spain teaching before moving to New York City to study fashion design at The Parsons School of Design. Since 1993, he has written the advice column “Ask Mr. Mickey” in PAPER Magazine.  His writing has appeared in the New York Times Magazine, Out and German Vogue. Boardman is an active commentator on the New York social/fashion scene and appears as a cultural commentator, lifestyle expert and fashion guru for networks like VH-1, A & E, CNN, Style Channel, E! and Fox News.

Boardman was recognized as one of New York magazine’s “Most Photographed Faces in New York” and voted by Fashion Week Daily as one of the most-invited people. Boardman has been featured in magazines and books like Smile i-D: Fashion & Style, 20 years of I-D Magazine, Simon Doonan’s Eccentric Glamour, Contrast Magazine and Timothy Greenfield-Sanders, Look: Portraits Backstage at Olympus Fashion Week. Also a philanthropist, Boardman has been active in many charitable efforts including Mr. Mickey’s Sidewalk Sale, Doctors Without Borders, Coalition for the Homeless and Red Cross earthquake relief for Haiti and Chile.  Boardman is a dedicated supporter of Citta, a charity that builds schools, clinics and women's cooperatives in India and Nepal.

References

American magazine editors
Purdue University alumni
People from Hanover Park, Illinois
Living people
Year of birth missing (living people)
Parsons School of Design alumni
American columnists
Writers from Illinois
American magazine writers
Writers from Manhattan
American advice columnists